A referendum on reducing the number of MPs was held in the Cook Islands on 17 November 2010, alongside the general elections. It failed at the ballot.

Background
The binding referendum required a two-thirds majority to pass.  However, it was unsuccessful, receiving only 4,983 votes and 59.2% support (of all votes, 63.8% of valid votes). Abstention was rather high, with 623 votes or 7.4% blank or invalid.

Poll
According to a poll published by the Cook Islands News on 11 September 2010, 76% of respondents supported the referendum proposal. A number of politicians publicly stated their support for the referendum proposal, including Democratic Party Leader Robert Wigmore and Cook Islands Party deputy leader Teina Bishop.

Results

References

Referendums in the Cook Islands
2010 referendums
2010 in the Cook Islands
November 2010 events in Oceania